Bridge City is a city in Orange County, Texas, United States. It is 100 miles east of Houston, near the Gulf of Mexico. The population was 9,546 at the 2020 Census. The town borders the Neches River and Cow Bayou. It is part of the Beaumont–Port Arthur Metropolitan Statistical Area. The area is mostly known for its association with the petroleum products (oil) industry.

History

The city was originally named Prairie View, as it was located on the coastal grasslands of the upper Texas coastline. But in 1938, the Port Arthur-Orange Bridge (now known as the Rainbow Bridge) was built, and the unincorporated area took on the name "Bridge City". Despite several previous attempts, the city did not incorporate until 1970.

Bridge City got its name from the fact that one has to cross a bridge to enter the city.  All three major roads that enter Bridge City—Chemical Road, SH 87, and F.M. 1442—cross a body of water.  SH 87 crosses the Neches River and Cow Bayou—Cow Bayou on the Orange side and the Neches River on the Port Arthur side.  Chemical Road crosses a branch off of the Sabine River and Cow Bayou. F.M. 1442 crosses a small creek off Cow Bayou between F.M. 105 and the Bridge City City limits. F.M. 1442 also crosses Cow Bayou just north of Orangefield and south of Interstate 10.

In 1990, Bridge City became the first city in Texas to install "leaning" streetlights because of the tall electrical lines near the roadway .

In 2008, the storm surge generated by Hurricane Ike caused nearly complete flooding of Bridge City. Mayor Kirk Roccaforte estimated that only 14 homes in the city were unaffected by the surge. The piles of debris and waterlogged furniture placed outside homes by residents beginning to clean up led the mayor to say "The whole city looks like a flea market."

Geography

Bridge City is located at  (30.034211, –93.842836).

Natural disasters
Bridge City, including surrounding areas, has had a long history of hurricanes and tropical storms.

Hurricane Humberto (2007) 
Widespread flooding occurred in Jefferson and Orange county, and at least 20 homes in Beaumont were flooded from Hurricane Humberto. Additionally, several roadways were flooded. The passage of the hurricane caused one fatality in the state; a Bridge City man was killed when his carport crashed on him outside his house. The combination of saturated grounds and strong winds uprooted many trees and downed power lines across the path of the hurricane, with at least 50 high voltage transmission poles blown down or seriously damaged; over 120,000 power customers in Orange and Jefferson counties lost power, with 118,000 Entergy customers in the state without electricity.  The National Weather Service estimates gusts exceeded 90 mph (145 km/h) in southwestern Jefferson County and extreme southeastern Chambers County.

Hurricane Ike (2008)
Bridge City, Texas was heavily damaged by Hurricane Ike on September 13, 2008. Damage was widespread and severe across Orange County. With over 95 percent of buildings and houses in Bridge City totally gutted, the city was nearly completely destroyed. The  storm surge completely flooded the city and obliterated everything in its way. Storm surge breached the levee at the City of Orange, and traveled up the Neches River to flood Rose City. It took three days to drain the water from the city. The city government gutted the city hall due to the Ike damages. The first city council meeting after Ike was held there sometime recent before January 19, 2009. Of the 3,400 houses in Bridge City, 16 were still habitable immediately after Ike.

In the City of Orange, right next to Bridge City, nearly the entire city of 19,000 people was flooded, anywhere from 6 inches (15 cm) to 15 feet (4.5 m). The mayor of the city said about 375 people, of those who stayed behind during the storm, began to emerge, some needing food, water and medical care. Many dead fish littered streets and properties. Bridge City Mayor Kirk Roccaforte estimated that only 14 homes in the city were unaffected by the surge. Five of which were in the Oakview addition on Louise Street. The piles of debris and waterlogged furniture placed outside homes by residents beginning to clean up led the mayor to say "The whole city looks like a flea market." During the post-storm cleanup, Bridge City residents found swimming pools had been occupied by jellyfish brought inland with the water. Three people were found dead in Orange County on September 29.

Hurricane Harvey (2017)
Hurricane Harvey was a huge rainfall producer. On the night of August 30, 2017, Bridge City was absolutely inundated with floodwaters, causing widespread damage. The past twenty-four hours had seen over 20 inches of rainfall. By the time Harvey was working its way toward Southeast Texas, it was a slow-moving storm, meaning everywhere in Harvey's path would be drenched in rainfall for several days before Harvey moved on.

Hurricane Laura (2020)
When Hurricane Laura hit, there was mainly wind damage in Bridge City. Several trees, light poles and traffic lights down due to the violent winds that Hurricane Laura brought. A wind gust of 73 mph was recorded at Port Arthur near Bridge City. The Orange County Airport's weather station went out during the storm.

Demographics

As of the 2020 United States census, there were 9,546 people, 2,798 households, and 2,200 families residing in the city.

As of the census of 2000, there were 8,651 people, 3,195 households, and 2,476 families residing in the city. The population density was 1,682.0 people per square mile (649.8/km2). There were 3,432 housing units at an average density of 667.3 per square mile (257.8/km2). The racial makeup of the city was 95.43% White, 0.20% Black or African American, 0.75% Native American, 1.40% Asian, 0.06% Pacific Islander, 1.27% from other races, and 0.89% from two or more races. 3.57% of the population were Hispanic or Latino of any race.

There were 3,195 households, out of which 36.7% had children under the age of 18 living with them, 62.0% were married couples living together, 10.6% had a female householder with no husband present, and 22.5% were non-families. 19.6% of all households were made up of individuals, and 8.8% had someone living alone who was 65 years of age or older. The average household size was 2.69 and the average family size was 3.07.

In the city, the population was spread out, with 27.0% under the age of 18, 9.5% from 18 to 24, 28.2% from 25 to 44, 23.1% from 45 to 64, and 12.3% who were 65 years of age or older. The median age was 36 years. For every 100 females, there were 96.4 males. For every 100 females age 18 and over, there were 93.5 males.

The median income for a household in the city was $42,045, and the median income for a family was $49,750. Males had a median income of $42,398 versus $22,674 for females. The per capita income for the city was $18,290. About 7.9% of families and 10.3% of the population were below the poverty line, including 13.1% of those under age 18 and 12.8% of those age 65 or over.

Bridge City was the only city in Orange County to have a growth in population according to the 1990 census .

Education

Bridge City is served by the Bridge City Independent School District.

Notable people

 Matt Bryant, NFL kicker (Atlanta Falcons)
 Randall "Tex" Cobb, prizefighter and actor
 Shane Dronett, NFL defensive lineman (Denver Broncos and Atlanta Falcons)
 Jason Matthews, NFL tackle (Indianapolis Colts and Tennessee Titans)
 Steve Worster, University of Texas at Austin football player

References

External links
 
 

Cities in Texas
Cities in Orange County, Texas
Hurricane Ike
Cities in the Beaumont–Port Arthur metropolitan area